Gurunath is a commonly used term when praising what is considered by devotees the ultimate source of compassion, love and truth - irrespective of sectarian divides whether they may be devotees of Shiva, the Lord of Transformation in the Hindu pantheon (Shaivaite) or of Vishnu, the Lord of Preservation and Sustenance in the Hindu pantheon (Vaishnav) or any other devotee (bhakta) of a Hindu God or Goddess.

The first part of the refrain "Bolo Sri Sat Gurunath Maharaj ki" is chanted by the leader of the kirtan, bhajan, devotional chanting of religious scriptures or highly devotional compositions made by individuals respectively, or devotional discourse. Then the congregation responds in unison with "Jai!". This refrain, which is normally chanted at the end of a bhajan or kirtan, may be translated from Sanskrit as "Say/Chant/Proclaim ("Bolo") the name of the Spiritual Mentor who is the essence of Truth ("Sri Sat Guru") who is Lord ("Nath") and King ("Maharaj")..."Yes!""

Spiritual title
Gurunath is also a spiritual title given to a householder Nath Guru by Shri Gurudev Mahendranath, who wrote that he had coined the term in 1986: "So I have coined a word—Gurunath ... This word can be the Western term for the same thing as Gurudev and it circumvents any religious or Eastern connections."
Shri Gurudev Mahendranath bestowed this title on at least two members of his lineage, Shri Gurunath Lokanath (1986) and Shri Gurunath Kapilnath (1989).

Name
Gurunath is a family name and a given name for males in India and Bangladesh.  Some notable persons named Gurunath include:
 Gurunath Aabaji Kulkarni (1923–1987) -  a short story writer in Marathi 
 Gurunath Sengupta (1848–1914) - a Sanskrit scholar and writer from Bangladesh
 Gurunath Vidyanidhi (1862–1931) - a Sanskrit scholar, writer and poet from Bangladesh

See also

 Lineage
 Guru
 Guru–shishya tradition
 Parampara
 Sampradaya
 Lineage (Buddhism)
 List of Hindu gurus
 Lifestyle
 Akhara
 Apprenticeship
 Chillum 
 Darshan
 Gurukula
 Kaupinam
 Kacchera
 Langota
 Others
 Aghori
 Charismatic authority
 Godman
 Guru Gita
 Hindu reform movements
 Lama
 Lifestyle guru
 Nath
 Religious conversion
 Shramana
 Sikh gurus
 Sifu
 Sensei

Notes

References
Shri Gurudev Mahendranath|Mahendranath, Shri Gurudev in The Open Door. International Nath Order. Retrieved March 8, 2006

Indian surnames
Indian masculine given names